Greenwood, Wisconsin may refer to:
Greenwood, Wisconsin, a city in Clark County, Wisconsin
Greenwood, Taylor County, Wisconsin, a town
Greenwood, Vernon County, Wisconsin, a town
Greenwood (community), Vernon County, Wisconsin, an unincorporated community